Joseph Anthony Bach (January 17, 1901 – October 24, 1966) was one of Notre Dame's famed "Seven Mules" and later the head coach for the NFL's Pittsburgh Pirates (1935–36) and later the renamed Pittsburgh Steelers (1952–53).

As a senior at Notre Dame, he was a lineman on the 1924 national title team — the first Irish team to win a championship, and had a pivotal role in Notre Dame's first Rose Bowl trip in January 1925. Famous for the Four Horsemen backfield, the line that blocked for them was known as "The Seven Mules."

Bach became the Pirates coach in 1935 directing the young franchise to their best record yet at 4 wins and 8 losses followed by the 1936 campaign in which he coached the Pirates to their first ever non-losing season at 6 wins and 6 losses.  He left the team following 1936 to go back into college football. 
 
After the 1951 season, Bach returned as the head coach for the Steelers and installed the T-formation. Pittsburgh had been the last franchise to operate the single wing.  The Steelers finished with 5 wins and 7 losses in 1952, and with 6 wins and 6 losses in 1953. Following three home defeats to begin the pre-season in 1954, Bach resigned during training camp in late August. He was succeeded by line coach Walt Kiesling, a previous head coach with the team.

Bach later worked as a state labor mediator and continued as a scout for the Steelers and was an active member of its alumni association. Minutes after the conclusion of a banquet luncheon in his honor in October 1966, Bach collapsed and died.

Head coaching record

College

References

External links
 

1901 births
1966 deaths
American football tackles
Boston Yanks coaches
Carleton Knights football players
Detroit Lions coaches
Duquesne Dukes football coaches
Fort Knox Armoraiders football coaches
National Football League announcers
New York Yanks coaches
Niagara Purple Eagles football coaches
Notre Dame Fighting Irish football players
Pittsburgh Pirates (football) coaches
Pittsburgh Steelers announcers
Pittsburgh Steelers coaches
St. Bonaventure Brown Indians football coaches
Syracuse Orange football coaches
People from Chisholm, Minnesota
Coaches of American football from Minnesota
Players of American football from Minnesota
Pittsburgh Pirates head coaches
Pittsburgh Steelers head coaches